Bryocella (Bry.o.cell’a. Gr. neut. n.; "bryon" - peat L. fem. n.; "cella" - cell N.L. fem. n.; "Bryocella" - peat-associated cell) is a genus of Gram-negative, non-spore forming, aerobic, rod-shaped bacteria from the family Acidobacteriaceae within subdivision 1 of the phylum Acidobacteriota. The type species of the genus is Bryocella elongata.

References 

Acidobacteriota
Acidophiles
Monotypic bacteria genera
Bacteria genera